The Medway EclipseR is a British ultralight trike designed and produced by Medway Microlights. The aircraft is supplied fully factory-built.

Design and development
The EclipseR is certified to the British BCAR Section "S" standard. It features a cable-braced hang glider-style high-wing, weight-shift controls, a two-seats-in-tandem open cockpit, tricycle landing gear and a single engine in pusher configuration.

The aircraft is made from tubing, with its double-surface Raven wing covered in Dacron sailcloth. Its  span wing is supported by a single tube-type kingpost and uses an "A" frame control bar. The carriage features a cockpit fairing with a windshield and wheel spats. Hydraulic brakes are standard equipment. The standard engine is the four-cylinder, four-stroke  Rotax 912UL.

Specifications (EclipseR)

References

External links

1990s British ultralight aircraft
Single-engined pusher aircraft
Ultralight trikes